Hurricane Tavern, also known as Workman Farm, is a national historic district located near Woodruff, Spartanburg County, South Carolina.  The district encompasses 30 contributing buildings, 1 contributing site, and 1 contributing structure on a rural farmstead.  They include the vernacular Federal style brick farmhouse, built about 1811, with major alterations and additions about 1850 and Bungalow modifications about 1920; a frame farmhouse (c. 1885, Brockman House), a country store (c. 1924), and a collection of late-19th and early-20th century agricultural outbuildings.

It was listed on the National Register of Historic Places in 2001.

References

Farms on the National Register of Historic Places in South Carolina
Houses completed in 1811
Buildings and structures in Spartanburg County, South Carolina
National Register of Historic Places in Spartanburg County, South Carolina
Houses in Spartanburg County, South Carolina